Giuseppe Rodoero (1643–1699) was a Roman Catholic prelate who served as Bishop of Acerra (1697–1699).

Biography
Giuseppe Rodoero was born in San Martin Montes Corbini, Italy on 18 October 1643. On 1 July 1697, he was appointed during the papacy of Pope Innocent XII as Bishop of Acerra. On 7 July 1697, he was consecrated bishop by Bandino Panciatici, Cardinal-Priest of San Pancrazio, with Prospero Bottini, Titular Archbishop of Myra, and Marcello d'Aste, Titular Archbishop of Athenae, serving as co-consecrators. He served as Bishop of Acerra until his death in October 1699.

References

External links and additional sources
 (for Chronology of Bishops) 
 (for Chronology of Bishops) 

17th-century Italian Roman Catholic bishops
Bishops appointed by Pope Innocent XII
1643 births
1699 deaths